Gluek is an unincorporated community in Crate Township, Chippewa County, Minnesota, United States. There was a terminus point on the Minnesota Western Railroad in the community until the railroad was abandoned. The primary route to Gluek, Chippewa County Road 4, was formerly Minnesota State Highway 277.

Notes

Unincorporated communities in Chippewa County, Minnesota
Unincorporated communities in Minnesota